Luis Bernardo Aguiar Burgos (born 17 November 1985) is a Uruguayan professional footballer who plays for Deportivo Maldonado as an attacking midfielder.

Club career
Born in Mercedes, Soriano Department, Aguiar started his career with Liverpool FC Montevideo. After an impressive season he transferred to FC Porto of Portugal but, after only two months with the club, not being able to reach the first team, he was loaned out during that season to C.F. Estrela da Amadora and Académica de Coimbra.

On 11 April 2008, Aguiar scored in a 3–0 surprise win for Académica against S.L. Benfica. His very first goal in the Primeira Liga proved crucial for the Coimbra side, which finally narrowly avoided relegation as 12th.

Aguiar remained in Portugal in June 2008, signing with rising S.C. Braga. He was essential in helping the Minho team win 11 of their first 15 competitive matches, netting on five occasions; on 23 October 2008, he scored from a free kick in another 3–0 upset, this time against England's Portsmouth in the group stage of the UEFA Cup.

After having been a permanent presence in Braga's qualification for the Europa League, Aguiar moved to FC Dynamo Moscow in Russia, for €2.5 millions. However, only a few months afterwards, he returned to league leaders – eventually finished second – Braga, on loan until June, eventually surpassing Hugo Viana in the pecking order at central midfielder. He returned to Dynamo after his loan expired, only to re-sign with the Portuguese the following month also on loan.

Aguiar started the 2010–11 campaign again in the starting XI, still under manager Domingos Paciência. However, he would ironically lose his place to Viana, and left in early January 2011, returning to his country after a lengthy absence and joining Peñarol, still owned by Dynamo Moscow.

On 5 July 2011, Aguiar was sold by Dynamo Moscow to Sporting CP, signing a four-year contract with the Lisbon club and reuniting with former Braga boss Paciência. However, in late September, without having made any official appearances, he returned to Peñarol, again on loan.

On 27 July 2012, Aguiar moved to Argentine Primera División side San Lorenzo de Almagro on a two-year deal. He subsequently returned to Peñarol for a further three Uruguayan Primera División seasons during which he involved in several incidents, being loaned to Brazil's Esporte Clube Vitória in 2014.

Aguiar returned to Braga for a fourth spell on 29 June 2016, becoming newly appointed manager José Peseiro's first signing. He terminated his contract in November, after only three minutes of competitive play.

In the following seasons, Aguiar represented in quick succession Alianza Lima (Peruvian Primera División) and Club Nacional de Football. On 3 January 2018, due to the transfer to the latter club, he received threats on social media; later in the same year, he was released.

On 11 February 2019, Aguiar joined Club Plaza Colonia de Deportes. Only three months later, he left due to personal reasons.

Personal life
Aguiar's older brother, Carlos, was also a footballer and a midfielder.

References

External links

1985 births
Living people
People from Mercedes, Uruguay
Uruguayan footballers
Association football midfielders
Uruguayan Primera División players
Uruguayan Segunda División players
Liverpool F.C. (Montevideo) players
Peñarol players
Club Nacional de Football players
Club Plaza Colonia de Deportes players
Juventud de Las Piedras players
Deportivo Maldonado players
Chilean Primera División players
Universidad de Concepción footballers
Primeira Liga players
FC Porto players
C.F. Estrela da Amadora players
Associação Académica de Coimbra – O.A.F. players
S.C. Braga players
Sporting CP footballers
Russian Premier League players
FC Dynamo Moscow players
Argentine Primera División players
Primera Nacional players
San Lorenzo de Almagro footballers
San Martín de Tucumán footballers
Campeonato Brasileiro Série A players
Esporte Clube Vitória players
Peruvian Primera División players
Club Alianza Lima footballers
Uruguay under-20 international footballers
Uruguayan expatriate footballers
Expatriate footballers in Chile
Expatriate footballers in Portugal
Expatriate footballers in Russia
Expatriate footballers in Argentina
Expatriate footballers in Brazil
Expatriate footballers in Peru
Uruguayan expatriate sportspeople in Chile
Uruguayan expatriate sportspeople in Portugal
Uruguayan expatriate sportspeople in Russia
Uruguayan expatriate sportspeople in Argentina
Uruguayan expatriate sportspeople in Brazil
Uruguayan expatriate sportspeople in Peru
Uruguayan sportspeople of Italian descent